This article lists important figures and events in Malaysian public affairs during the year 2002, together with births and deaths of notable Malaysians.

Incumbent political figures

Federal level
Yang di-Pertuan Agong: Tuanku Syed Sirajuddin
Raja Permaisuri Agong: Tuanku Fauziah
Prime Minister: Dato' Sri Dr Mahathir Mohamad
Deputy Prime Minister: Dato' Sri Abdullah Ahmad Badawi
Chief Justice: Mohamed Dzaiddin Abdullah

State level
 Sultan of Johor: Sultan Iskandar
 Sultan of Kedah: Sultan Abdul Halim Muadzam Shah
 Sultan of Kelantan: Sultan Ismail Petra
 Raja of Perlis: Tuanku Syed Faizuddin (Regent)
 Sultan of Perak: Sultan Azlan Shah
 Sultan of Pahang: Sultan Ahmad Shah
 Sultan of Selangor: Sultan Sharafuddin Idris Shah
 Sultan of Terengganu: Sultan Mizan Zainal Abidin (Deputy Yang di-Pertuan Agong)
 Yang di-Pertuan Besar of Negeri Sembilan: Tuanku Jaafar
 Yang di-Pertua Negeri (Governor) of Penang: Tun Abdul Rahman Abbas
 Yang di-Pertua Negeri (Governor) of Malacca: Tun Syed Ahmad Al-Haj bin Syed Mahmud Shahabuddin
 Yang di-Pertua Negeri (Governor) of Sarawak: Tun Abang Muhammad Salahuddin
 Yang di-Pertua Negeri (Governor) of Sabah: Tun Sakaran Dandai

Events
24 January – Parti Bersatu Sabah rejoins the Barisan Nasional coalition.
23 February – Malaysian Siamese twins Ahmad and Muhammad Rosli are successfully separated at King Fahd National Guard Hospital, Saudi Arabia.
24 February – 9 March – The 2002 Men's Hockey World Cup is held in Kuala Lumpur.
14 April – The Express Rail Link, Malaysia's first high speed train, is launched.
15 April – Prime Minister Mahathir Mohamad leaves for Morocco on the first leg of a week-long tour which will also take him to Libya and Bahrain.
19 April – About fourteen more suspected hardcore Kumpulan Militan Malaysia members, including a woman, are arrested under the Internal Security Act, bringing the number of KMM members held since May 2001 to 62.
22 April – Tuanku Syed Sirajuddin is installed as the 12th Yang di-Pertuan Agong.
8 June – Prime Minister Mahathir Mohamad visits Vatican City and meets Pope John Paul II for the first time.
22 June – Prime Minister Mahathir Mohamad announces that he will resign from office and be replaced by Abdullah Ahmad Badawi.
23 June – Pan-Malaysian Islamic Party president Fadzil Noor dies after undergoing heart bypass surgery. He is succeeded as PAS President and leader of the opposition in Parliament by Abdul Hadi Awang.
June – The 2002 World's Strongest Man competition is held in Kuala Lumpur.
July – The Pendang MP by-election is won by Barisan Nasional's Othman Abdul.
8 August – Judge Datuk James Foong of the Kuala Lumpur High Court, Wisma Denmark, Jalan Ampang, decides that seven out of the ten people being sued by 60 residents, relatives and families of the Highland Towers tragedy were negligent.
11–13 October – 2002 Malaysian motorcycle Grand Prix
21 November – The bungalow of the Affin Bank chairman General (RtD) Tan Sri Ismail Omar collapses during a landslide in Taman Hillview, Ulu Klang, Selangor. Eight people are killed.
4 December – Arab-Malaysian Finance Bhd appeales to Court of Appeal President Tan Sri Lamin Yunus to meet with Court of Appeal Judge Datuk Mokhtar Sidin and Datuk Mohd Saari Yusoff on compensation to be paid to victims of the Highland Towers collapse. At the Court of Appeal, three judges led by Datuk Gopal Sri Ram with Datuk Richard Malanjum and Datuk Wira Ghazali Mohd Yusoff order three negligent parties to pay damages – Ampang Jaya Municipal Council 15%, engineer Wong Yuen Kean 10%, Arab-Malaysian 30%, Metrolux Sdn Bhd and MBF Property Services Sdn Bhd 20%. 
18 December – The islands of Sipadan and Ligitan are officially awarded to Malaysia by the International Court of Justice, who reject the Indonesian claim to the islands.

Births
5 March – Luqman Hakim Shamsudin – Footballer
5 March — Firdaus Ghufran — Actor 
23 March – Sikh Izhan Nazrel – Footballer 
30 April - Amirul Naim Shahruddin - Footballer 
4 May – Arif Aiman – Footballer
25 May — Muhammad Khairudin Mohd Khary — Actor 
6 June — Junaidi Arif — Badminton player 
16 June – Mohamad Aniq Kasdan – Weightlifter 
25 June – Zikri Khalili – Footballer
19 July — Loh Jing Yi — Footballer 
11 September — Muhammad Harith Haziq Mohd Hussein — Footballer
14 November — Yap Wei Xuan — Actor
26 December — Muhammad Haikal — Badminton player

Deaths
23 June – Fadzil Noor – The president of PAS political party, a member of parliament for Pendang and state assemblyman for Anak Bukit, Kedah
31 August – Tan Sri Wong Pow Nee – Penang's first Chief Minister
30 October – Rejabhad – Famous cartoonist

See also
 2001 in Malaysia | 2003 in Malaysia
 History of Malaysia
 List of Malaysian films of 2002

References 

 
Years of the 21st century in Malaysia
2000s in Malaysia
Malaysia
Malaysia